Carlene is a girl's given name, a variant of Charlene, that reached a peak of popularity in America in the 1950s. US birth records show over 12,000 birth names as Carlene from 1916 to 1972 with a peak of 371 birth names in 1955.

Several songs have been titled after the name – by the New Monkees (1987), then the best-known Carlene (Phil Vassar song), and a song by Westbound Train (2003).

People with the given name Carlene
Carlene Aguilar, Filipino actress and a former beauty queen
Jazz (wrestler) (redirect from Carlene Begnaud) (1973) American professional wrestler
Carlene Carter (1955), American country singer
Carlene Davis (1953), Jamaican gospel and reggae singer
Carlene LeFevre, competitive eater from Henderson, Nevada
Carlene Mitchell, American coach
Carlene Smith, Jamaica's first Dancehall Queen crowned in 1992
Carlene M. Walker, American politician and businesswoman from Utah
Carlene West (born c. 1945), Australian Indigenous artist

References

See also

Carlee
Carlena
Carlyne
Karlene

Feminine given names
English-language feminine given names
English feminine given names